John Anthony Bailey  (June 4, 1947 – November 13, 1994), also known as Jack Baker, was an American actor.

Life 
John Anthony Bailey was born on June 4, 1947 in Ohio, U.S. Bailey lived in San Francisco, California during the early 1970s where he attended Merritt College in Oakland and performed in numerous stage and film productions. His performances included Richard Wesley's The Black Terror, for John Cochran's Black Repertory West, J. E. Franklin's Black Girl with Adilah Barnes, work with the improvisational theatre group, The Pitschel Players, and appearances with other San Francisco Bay Area theater companies. Bailey also appeared in the Sun Ra film Space Is the Place (made in 1972 and released in 1974).

Career 
Bailey is best known for the role of C.C. McNamara on the Sid and Marty Krofft children's television program Wonderbug (1976). He also appeared in two episodes of Happy Days as "Sticks", the drummer of Richie's band; M*A*S*H (1972), Good Times (1975) and in the feature film, The Kentucky Fried Movie (1977).

During the 1980s, Bailey began a career in pornographic films under the pseudonym Jack Baker. In 1984, he appeared in Let Me Tell Ya 'bout White Chicks, produced and directed by Gregory Dark. His other collaborations with Dark include New Wave Hookers (1985), The Devil in Miss Jones 3: A New Beginning and The Devil in Miss Jones 4: The Final Outrage (both 1986).

Although his pornographic career initially had often called on him to participate in the explicit sex scenes, somewhere around the time of the "Miss Jones" movies, he had largely, for the most part, ceased performing hardcore sex on-screen, and became known as a "non-sex" actor in the business. His adult roles (particularly for the Dark Brothers) often were comedic in nature, and poked fun at racial stereotypes.

According to the Internet Adult Film Database, Bailey appeared in more than 140 films and produced one movie.

Death 
Bailey died of bladder cancer in 1994, at the age of 47, in Los Angeles, California. He was buried in The Los Angeles County Cemetery.

References

External links
 
 
 

1947 births
1994 deaths
20th-century American male actors
20th-century African-American people
Male actors from Ohio
Pornographic film actors from Ohio
African-American male actors
African-American pornographic film actors
African-American writers
American male writers
American male film actors
American male television actors
Deaths from cancer in California
Deaths from bladder cancer
American male pornographic film actors
Male actors from Los Angeles
Merritt College alumni